The 2019–20 Richmond Spiders men's basketball team represented the University of Richmond during the 2019–20 NCAA Division I men's basketball season. They were led by 15th-year head coach Chris Mooney and played their home games at the Robins Center as members of the Atlantic 10 Conference. The Spiders finished the season 24–7, 14–4 in A-10 play to finish in second place. Their season ended when the A-10 tournament and all other postseason tournaments were canceled due to the ongoing coronavirus pandemic.

Previous season
The Spiders finished the 2018–19 season 13–20, 6–12 in A-10 play to finish in a tie with Saint Joseph's for tenth place. As the No. 11 seed in the A-10 tournament, they defeated Fordham in the first round before losing to Saint Louis in the second round.

Offseason

Departures

Assistant coach Kim Lewis also left the team after six seasons in the position, joining the staff of Mercer University in the same role. Richmond's director of basketball operations Steve Thomas was promoted to fill the vacancy left by Lewis.

Incoming transfers

2019 recruiting class

Roster

Schedule and results

|-
!colspan=9 style=| Exhibition

|-
!colspan=9 style=| Non-conference regular season

|-
!colspan=12 style=| A-10 regular season

|-
!colspan=9 style=| A-10 tournament

Sources:

References

Richmond
Richmond Spiders men's basketball seasons
Richmond Spiders men's basketball
Richmond Spiders men's basketball